KVAK-FM is a commercial adult contemporary/classic rock radio station in Valdez, Alaska, broadcasting on 93.3FM.

KVAK-FM obtains its programming from Dial Global Networks.

External links
93.3 KVAK-FM official website

VAK-FM
Mainstream adult contemporary radio stations in the United States
Classic rock radio stations in the United States
Radio stations established in 1999
1999 establishments in Alaska